In radiative heat transfer, a view factor, is the proportion of the radiation which leaves surface  that strikes surface . In a complex 'scene' there can be any number of different objects, which can be divided in turn into even more surfaces and surface segments.
View factors are also sometimes known as configuration factors, form factors, angle factors or shape factors.

Summation of view factors 
Because radiation leaving a surface is conserved, the sum of all view factors from a given surface, is unity:

For example, consider a case where two blobs with surfaces A and B are floating around in a cavity with surface C. All of the radiation that leaves A must either hit B or C, or if A is concave, it could hit A. 100% of the radiation leaving A is divided up among A, B, and C.

Confusion often arises when considering the radiation that arrives at a target surface. In that case, it generally does not make sense to sum view factors as view factor from A and view factor from B (above) are essentially different units. C may see 10%  of A 's radiation and 50% of B 's radiation and 20% of C 's radiation, but without knowing how much each radiates, it does not even make sense to say that C receives 80% of the total radiation.

Self-viewing surfaces 
For a convex surface, no radiation can leave the surface and then hit  later, because radiation travels in straight lines. Hence, for convex surfaces, 

For concave surfaces, this doesn't apply, and so for concave surfaces

Superposition rule 
The superposition rule (or summation rule) is useful when a certain geometry is not available with given charts or graphs. The superposition rule allows us to express the geometry that is being sought using the sum or difference of geometries that are known.

Reciprocity 
The reciprocity theorem for view factors allows one to calculate  if one already knows .

View factors of differential areas 

The view factor from a general surface  to another general surface  is given by:

The view factor is related to the etendue.

Nusselt analog 

A geometrical picture that can aid intuition about the view factor was developed by Wilhelm Nusselt, and is called the Nusselt analog.  The view factor between a differential element dAi and the element Aj can be obtained projecting the element Aj onto the surface of a unit hemisphere, and then projecting that in turn onto a unit circle around the point of interest in the plane of Ai.
The view factor is then equal to the differential area dAi times the proportion of the unit circle covered by this projection.

The projection onto the hemisphere, giving the solid angle subtended by Aj, takes care of the factors cos(θ2) and 1/r2; the projection onto the circle and the division by its area then takes care of the local factor cos(θ1) and the normalisation by π.

The Nusselt analog has on occasion been used to actually measure form factors for complicated surfaces, by photographing them through a suitable fish-eye lens. (see also Hemispherical photography). But its main value now is essentially in building intuition.

See also 
 Radiosity, a matrix calculation method for solving radiation transfer between a number of bodies.
 Gebhart factor, an expression to solve radiation transfer problems between any number of surfaces.

References

External links 
A large number of 'standard' view factors can be calculated with the use of tables that are commonly provided in heat transfer textbooks.
 List of view factors for specific geometry cases
 View3D, a computer program (FOSS) for calculating view factors in 2D and 3D.

Heat transfer